Louis-Joseph Papineau (October 7, 1786 – September 23, 1871), born in Montreal, Quebec, was a politician, lawyer, and the landlord of the seigneurie de la Petite-Nation. He was the leader of the reformist Patriote movement before the Lower Canada Rebellion of 1837–1838. His father was Joseph Papineau, also a politician in Quebec. Papineau was the eldest of eight children and was the grandfather of the journalist Henri Bourassa, founder of the newspaper Le Devoir. Louis-Joseph Papineau is commemorated by a public artwork installed in the metro station, Papineau that serves the street named for his father Joseph Papineau. L'École Secondaire Louis-Joseph Papineau in Montreal was named after him.

Speaker of the Legislative Assembly 
Papineau was elected Speaker of the Legislative Assembly of Lower Canada on January 21, 1815. The same year, he replaced Pierre-Stanislas Bédard as leader of the Parti Canadien. Under his leadership, the party worked for the reform of Lower Canada's political institutions and strongly opposed the abuses of the appointed Legislative Council.

In 1820, he refused a position on the Legislative Council offered by governor Dalhousie.

Childhood and education 

Papineau was described as an energetic child. He first studied in Montreal, at the Collège Saint-Raphaël from 1796 onwards, then at the Petit Séminaire de Québec, from 1802 to 1804. His arrival at the Petit Séminaire de Québec was highly anticipated, and his reputation preceding him. Upon graduation, he began an apprenticeship under his father with the goal of becoming a blacksmith, but this was quickly abandoned when the young Papineau turned to law, joining his cousin Denis-Benjamin Viger. Viger "was for a time the assembly's agent in London and became one of Papineau's prominent supporters and close friends, but after the rebellion, he was to follow Lafontaine."

Papineau's later childhood was mainly spent on the seigniory of la Petite Nation, located on the Ottawa river, which was purchased by his father in 1801 from the Quebec Seminary. During his time spent at the seigniory of La Petite-Nation, Papineau was sent to study at the College Saint-Raphaël in Montreal, where he rebelled and was forced to leave college. He was then sent to study at the Petit Seminaire de Québec, where he completed his secondary studies.

In 1808 Papineau was elected member of parliament for Kent (now Chambly, Quebec) before being admitted to the Bar of Lower Canada in 1810. Later, he served as a militia officer in the War of 1812.

In 1822, he was sent to London with John Neilson to present a petition of 60,000 signatures against the Union project. While in the United Kingdom, he was replaced by Joseph-Rémi Vallières de Saint-Réal as Speaker.

In 1826, he was chosen leader of the Patriotes, a reformed and more radical Parti Canadien. In 1831, he sponsored a law which granted full equivalent political rights to Jews, 27 years before anywhere else in the British Empire. The events that led to Jews receiving full citizenship rights in Lower Canada in advance of other nations or territories in the British Dominion were due to the involvement of one Ezekiel Hart, a Jew who had proved his dedication to the burgeoning Canadian identity by raising money to support troops in Lower Canada to help in defence against United States invasion from the south.

Louis-Joseph was part of the committee that wrote the Ninety-Two Resolutions passed by the Legislative Assembly on February 21, 1834. The resolutions called for an elected Legislative Council and an Executive Council responsible before the house of the people's representatives.

Leader of the Patriotes 

The British government eventually responded to the 92 Resolutions by issuing ten resolutions of their own, the Russell Resolutions (named after the Home Secretary, Lord John Russell).  The British government rejected all of the 92 Resolutions.  After the arrival of the Russell Resolutions in Lower Canada on March 6, 1837, Papineau led the movement of protest and participated in numerous popular assemblies. He led the committee that organized the boycott of essentially all British imports to Lower Canada. On November 15, he created the Conseil des Patriotes with Edmund Bailey O'Callaghan. He and O'Callaghan fled Montreal for Saint-Denis-sur-Richelieu on November 16, after governor Lord Gosford ordered their arrest and that of 25 other Patriot leaders. Papineau and O'Callaghan went to the home of Wolfred Nelson. He crossed the United States border on November 25.

In exile 

On February 8, 1839, he departed to leave New York City for Paris where he hoped to get France involved. In May, he published the Histoire de l'insurrection du Canada (History of the insurrection in Canada) in the magazine Progrès. Despite meeting with influential politicians such as Lamartine and Lamennais, the France of Louis-Philippe also remained neutral. After his wife left in 1843 "he spent a large part of his leisure in the main archival repositories in Paris, where he copied documents relating to French rule in Canada".

His role in the 1837 rebellions against British rule forced him into exile until 1845, when, three years after he had been granted amnesty, he finally decided to return to what in 1845 was called the Province of Canada but he visited Italy and Switzerland before getting to the Province of Canada. He only returned to Montreal after he had been granted amnesty by the colonial government as well.

Return to politics 

In 1848, he was elected member of the new united Legislative Assembly of the Province of Canada in the riding of Saint-Maurice. In severe disagreement with the emerging French Canadian Liberal Party, he sat as an independent member. A convinced republican after a long exile in the United States and France, Papineau supported the Montreal Annexation Manifesto that called for Canada to join the United States of America.

Louis-Joseph Papineau, along with John Molson Jr., the son of John Molson, and Horatio Gates, served as the first Vice-Presidents of the Montreal Mechanics' Institute. He participated in the creation of the Parti rouge. He was defeated in 1851 but elected in a by-election in 1852. He did not present himself again in the elections of 1854. He retired from public life and reappeared only once to hold a conference at the Institut Canadien de Montréal in December 1867. He died at his manor in Montebello, Quebec near the modern Château Montebello on September 23, 1871.

Both Papineau's manor house in Montebello and his house in Montreal are National Historic Sites, and both are units of the national park system. The one in Montreal, designated in 1968, is closed to the public, but the Montebello property, designated in 1986, is open seasonally, from May to October. Papineau, himself, was named a National Historic Person in 1937. A federal plaque reflecting that status was finally unveiled in 2022, with plans to install it at Montebello.

On October 21, 2012, a monument to his memory was unveiled at Saint-Denis-sur-Richelieu by Quebec Premier Pauline Marois.

Family 

M. Papineau married Julie Papineau (née Julie Bruneau) in Quebec City on April 29, 1818. Together, they had 9 children .

Amédée Papineau (1819–1903) – heir of Louis-Joseph;
Didier Papineau (1820–1821);
Lachance Papineau (1822–1862) – died in a mental institution;
Arthur Papineau (1824–1825);
Aurelie Papineau (1826–1830);
Ézilda Papineau (1828–1894) – suffering from dwarfism, did not have any children and stayed all her life in Montebello, Quebec;
Gustave Papineau (1830–1851);
Charles Papineau (1833–1834);
Azélie Papineau (1834–1869) – married the painter and architect Napoléon Bourassa (1827–1916), mother of Henri Bourassa, a famous journalist.

Bibliography 

 "A Chronology of the Life of Louis-Joseph Papineau", Manoir-Papineau National Historic site of Canada, Parks Canada
 
 Fernand Ouellet. "Louis-Joseph Papineau: A Divided Soul", in Canadian Historical Association, 11, Ottawa, 1960
 James Marsh. Papineau, Louis-Joseph, in the Canadian Encyclopedia 
 Edmund Bailey O'Callaghan. "A Biographical Sketch of the Hon. Louis Joseph Papineau, Speaker of the House of Assembly of Lower Canada", in Sentinel, Saratoga Springs, 1838
 Gustave Proulx. Le Combat Magnifique: Louis-Joseph Papineau. Montréal: Les Presses de "La Presse", 1973. 124 p. Without ISBN
 Thomas Storrow Brown. "Brief sketch of the life and times of the late Hon. Louis-Joseph Papineau", in New Dominion Monthly, 1872, January 1872, 20 pages
 Johnny-Normand Pickering [-LeBlanc]: Le Mémorial Papineau, Éditions du Fleuve, Montréal, 1989

Art Works

Paintings 
Napoléon Bourassa, Louis-Joseph Papineau, beau-père de l'artiste, 1858, 152 x 114,9 cm, Musée national des beaux-arts du Québec, Québec.

Alfred Boisseau, Louis-Joseph Papineau, 1871, Musée national des beaux-arts du Québec, Québec.

Charles Alexander Smith, L'Assemblée des six comtés à Saint-Charles-sur-Richelieu en 1837, 1891, Musée national des beaux-arts du Québec, Québec.

Lithography 
Gerome Fassio, adapted from Antoine Maurin, Louis-Joseph Papineau, 1844, lithography, 37,8 x 30,7 cm, Musée national des beaux-arts du Québec, Québec.

Sculptures 
Louis-Philippe Hébert, adapted from Napoléon Bourassa, Louis-Joseph Papineau, 1874,  28,8 x 14 x 11,5 cm, Musée national des beaux-arts du Québec, Québec.

Louis-Philippe Hébert, Louis-Joseph Papineau, 1887,  75 x 28 x 24 cm, Musée national des beaux-arts du Québec, Québec.

Napoléon Bourassa, Louis-Joseph Papineau, 1900,  72 x 60,4 x 13,1 cm, Musée national des beaux-arts du Québec, Québec.

Napoléon Bourassa, Louis-Joseph Papineau, 1900, 48 x 37 x 10 cm, Musée national des beaux-arts du Québec, Québec.

Napoléon Bourassa, Louis-Joseph Papineau, 1900, 48 x 37 x 10 cm, Musée national des beaux-arts du Québec, Québec.

Napoléon Bourassa, Louis-Joseph Papineau, 1900, 58 x 45,5 x 10 cm, Musée national des beaux-arts du Québec, Québec.

Napoléon Bourassa, Louis-Joseph Papineau, 1900, 58 x 45,5 x 10 cm, Musée national des beaux-arts du Québec, Québec.

Napoléon Bourassa, Louis-Joseph Papineau, 1900, 48 x 37 x 10 cm, Musée national des beaux-arts du Québec, Québec.

Napoléon Bourassa, Louis-Joseph Papineau, 1900, 47 x 36 x 10 cm, Musée national des beaux-arts du Québec, Québec.

Photography 
Thomas Coffin Doane, Louis-Joseph Papineau, Daguerréotype, c. 1852, Library and Archives Canada, reference #3195235

Jules-Isaïe Benoît, dit Livernois, Louis-Joseph Papineau. Photographie d'un tableau de Théophile Hamel, 1863, Musée national des beaux-arts du Québec, Québec.

Unknown, Louis-Joseph Papineau, de l'album Eugène-Hamel, circa 1865, 9,8 x 5,1 cm and; 7,8 x 4,6 cm, Musée national des beaux-arts du Québec, Québec.

Henri-Napoléon Grenier, Louis-Joseph Papineau, de l'album de collection dit de Napoléon Garneau, 1870-1871, 10,2 x 6,3 cm; and 9,5 x 5,9 cm , Musée national des beaux-arts du Québec, Québec.

Unknown, Le Musée du manoir Papineau, à Montebello, circa 1895, 25,3 x 30,3 cm and 16,3 x 21,3 cm,  Musée national des beaux-arts du Québec, Québec.

Photo-engraving 
Napoléon Bourassa, Louis-Joseph Papineau, circa 1900, 13,5 x 9 cm and 38,1 x 29,2 cm, Musée national des beaux-arts du Québec, Québec.

Drawing 
Jobson Paradis, La Chapelle funéraire Papineau, Montebello, circa 1900-1915, 23,4 x 28,6 cm, Musée national des beaux-arts du Québec, Québec.

Note 
The Art works section was copied and adapted from the French Wikipedia page of Louis-Joseph Papineau . See that page's history for attribution.

Archives 
There is a Papineau family collection at Library and Archives Canada. There is also a Papineau family fonds at Bibliothèque et Archives nationales du Québec.

See also 

 Quebec nationalism
 History of Quebec
 Timeline of Quebec history
 Denis-Benjamin Papineau
 Amédée Papineau
 Société des Fils de la Liberté

References

External links 
 
 
 Les 92 Résolutions (PDF in French)
 Unofficial English translation of the Political Testament of Louis-Joseph Papineau
 Ancestry of Louis-Joseph Papineau (in French).
Historica’s Heritage Minute video docudrama about “Hart and Papineau.” (Adobe Flash Player)
Louis-Joseph Papineau: The Demi-God, a 1961 National Film Board of Canada dramatization (Adobe Flash Player)

1786 births
1871 deaths
Lawyers from Montreal
Members of the Legislative Assembly of Lower Canada
Members of the Legislative Assembly of the Province of Canada from Canada East
Canadian people of the War of 1812
Politicians from Montreal
Canadian republicans
Canadian Roman Catholics
Recipients of Canadian royal pardons
Persons of National Historic Significance (Canada)
Lower Canada Rebellion people
Collège Saint-Raphaël alumni
Petit Séminaire de Québec alumni